Hot Summer may refer to:

 Hot Summer (album), a 1988 album by Leslie Cheung
 Hot Summer, re-release of f(x) album Pinocchio
 Hot Summer (film), a 1968 East German musical film
 "Hot Summer" (song), a 2007 song by Monrose
 Hot Summer of 1975, a period of instability in Portuguese history